See How They Fall (French: Regarde les hommes tomber) is a 1994 film directed by Jacques Audiard.  It stars Jean-Louis Trintignant, Jean Yanne  and Matthieu Kassovitz. It won three César Awards for Best First Work, Best Editing and Most Promising Actor in 1995.

Plot
Simon, a sales representative, tries to track down the people who shot his friend Mickey, a police officer.

Cast
Jean-Louis Trintignant as Marx
Jean Yanne as Simon
Mathieu Kassovitz as Johnny
Bulle Ogier as Louise
Christine Pascal as Sandrine

References

External links

1994 films
Films directed by Jacques Audiard
French crime films
Best First Feature Film César Award winners
1990s French-language films
Films based on American novels
Films with screenplays by Jacques Audiard
1994 directorial debut films
1990s French films